The New York City Department of Finance (DOF) is the revenue service, taxation agency and recorder of deeds of the government of New York City. Its Parking Violations Bureau is an administrative court that adjudicates parking violations, while its Sheriff's Office is the city's primary civil law enforcement agency.

Responsibilities

The Department of Finance (DOF) collects more than $33.2 billion in revenue for the City and values more than one million properties worth a total market value of $988 billion. In addition, DOF also:
 Records property-related documents
 Administers exemption and abatement programs
 Adjudicates and collects parking tickets
 Maintains the city's treasury
 Participates on and provides administrative support for the NYC Banking Commission
 Oversees the New York City Sheriff's Office, which acts as DOF's law enforcement division and the City's chief civil law enforcement agency.
Through the Mayor's Office of Pensions and Investments, the Department of Finance also advises the Administration on the City's $160 billion pension system and $15 billion deferred compensation plan.

Organization

Commissioner of Finance: Preston Niblack
First Deputy Commissioner: Jeffrey Shear
Deputy Commissioner for Treasury and Payment Services 
Payments and Receivable Services 
Adjudications and Parking (Parking Violations Bureau)
City Register and Land Records
Collections
Treasury Operations
Payment Operations
Deputy Commissioner for Tax Audit and Enforcement
Tax Audit 
Tax Enforcement 
Property Valuation
Deputy Commissioner for Property Division
Property Exemption Administration
Property Valuation and Tax Mapping
Chief Information Officer for Finance Information Technology
Property, Collections and Accounting Applications
Network Operations
Parking and Payment Applications
Project Management
Tax Policy, Audit and Assessment Applications
BTS Systems Modernization
 Deputy Commissioner for General Counsel
 Legal Affairs
 Department Advocate's Office 
 Chief Financial Officer for Administration and Planning
 Employee Services
 Financial Management
 ACCO
 Deputy Commissioner and Sheriff
 First Deputy Sheriff

History
In 1986, the department's Parking Violations Bureau was at the center of a corruption scheme involving kickbacks (bribes) over the selection of hand-held computers for issuing traffic summonses.

See also
New York State Department of Taxation and Finance
Internal Revenue Service
 New York City Office of Administrative Trials and Hearings
 New York City Mayor's Office of Management and Budget

References

External links
Official website
 Department of Finance in the Rules of the City of New York

 
Taxation in New York (state)
Local taxation in the United States
Revenue services